The Ghana Women's Super Cup is an annual game, featuring the teams that won the Ghana Women's Premier League and the Ghana Women's FA Cup in the previous season. The first edition was contested on 23 April 2017 between Ampem Darkoa Ladies and Police Ladies at Baba Yara Sports Stadium, Kumasi. The game also signals the curtain opener for the new football season.

List of finals

Performance by club

See also 

 Women's football in Ghana
 Ghana Women's Premier League
 Ghana Women's FA Cup

References

External links 
 Prisons Ladies to lock horns with Ampem Darkoa

National women's association football supercups
Women's football competitions in Ghana
2018 establishments in Ghana
Recurring sporting events established in 2018